Advance! is an album by drummer Philly Joe Jones which was recorded in 1978 and released on the Galaxy in the following year.

Reception

The AllMusic review by Scott Yanow stated "Drummer Philly Joe Jones led a few sets for Galaxy during the 1977-78 period that featured veteran hard bop-oriented players. ... Fine music".

Track listing
 "Trailways" (Philly Joe Jones) – 6:56
 "Invitation" (Bronisław Kaper, Paul Francis Webster) – 6:59	
 "Helena" (Arlene Chapman) – 5:57	
 "Waltz, Midnight" (Cedar Walton) – 11:01
 "Smoke Gets in Your Eyes" (Jerome Kern, Otto Harbach) – 8:15

Personnel
Philly Joe Jones – drums 
Blue Mitchell – trumpet
Slide Hampton – trombone
Harold Land – tenor saxophone
Charles Bowen – tenor saxophone, soprano saxophone
Cedar Walton – piano
Marc Johnson – bass

References

Galaxy Records albums
Philly Joe Jones albums
1979 albums